Chilton Woods State Forest is a  state forest located on the Northern Neck in Lancaster County, Virginia, near the town of Warsaw.

History
Chilton Woods State Forest was formed in July 2000 after Catherine B. Chilton turned the land over to state control; the Virginia Department of Forestry had aided her and her husband when they took control of the property in 1954.  Upon his death in 1973, Mr. Chilton's will left the land to his wife, with the stipulation that she turn it over to the Commonwealth upon her death.

Description
The forest includes Lancaster Creek and the Corrotoman River, both of which are tributaries of the Rappahannock River.  Most of the forest's trees are loblolly pine, with areas of mixed pine and hardwoods. Herbaceous plants within the forest include the showy orchis and pink lady's slipper. Management of the forest focuses on timber production and enhancement of wildlife habitat, in addition to providing space for public recreation such as hiking and birdwatching.

Public use and access
The forest is open to the public for horseback riding and hiking; hunting is limited to archery and black powder rifle use only. Camping and motorized vehicles are prohibited. Some uses may require visitors to possess a valid State Forest Use Permit.

See also
 List of Virginia state forests

References

External links
Virginia Department of Forestry: Chilton Woods State Forest

Virginia state forests
Protected areas of Lancaster County, Virginia
Protected areas established in 2000
2000 establishments in Virginia